The 2020 Spain Masters (officially known as the Barcelona Spain Masters 2020) was a badminton tournament which was held at the Pavelló de la Vall d'Hebron in Barcelona, Spain, from 18 to 23 February 2020 with a total prize purse of $170,000.

Tournament
The 2020 Spain Masters was the fourth tournament of the 2020 BWF World Tour and also part of the Spain Masters championships, which have been held since 2018. This tournament was organized by the Spanish Badminton Federation and sanctioned by the BWF.

Venue
This international tournament was held at the Pavelló de la Vall d'Hebron in Barcelona, Spain.

Point distribution
Below is the point distribution for each phase of the tournament based on the BWF points system for the BWF World Tour Super 300 event.

Prize money
The total prize money for this tournament was US$170,000. Distribution of prize money was in accordance with BWF regulations.

Men's singles

Seeds

 Viktor Axelsen (champion)
 B. Sai Praneeth (withdrew)
 Srikanth Kidambi (second round)
 Wang Tzu-wei (first round)
 Rasmus Gemke (quarter-finals)
 Lin Dan (withdrew)
 Jan Ø. Jørgensen (quarter-finals)
 Lu Guangzu (withdrew)

Finals

Top half

Section 1

Section 2

Bottom half

Section 3

Section 4

Women's singles

Seeds

 Carolina Marín (final)
 Mia Blichfeldt (withdrew)
 Busanan Ongbamrungphan (semi-finals)
 Wang Zhiyi (withdrew)
 Saina Nehwal (quarter-finals)
 Pornpawee Chochuwong (champion)
 Han Yue (withdrew)
 Cai Yanyan (withdrew)

Finals

Top half

Section 1

Section 2

Bottom half

Section 3

Section 4

Men's doubles

Seeds

 Lee Yang / Wang Chi-lin (final)
 Aaron Chia / Soh Wooi Yik (semi-finals)
 Han Chengkai / Zhou Haodong (withdrew)
 Kim Astrup / Anders Skaarup Rasmussen (champions)
 Liao Min-chun / Su Ching-heng (quarter-finals)
 Mark Lamsfuß / Marvin Emil Seidel (quarter-finals)
 Lu Ching-yao / Yang Po-han (semi-finals)
 Mathias Boe / Mads Conrad-Petersen (first round)

Finals

Top half

Section 1

Section 2

Bottom half

Section 3

Section 4

Women's doubles

Seeds

 Greysia Polii / Apriyani Rahayu (champions)
 Jongkolphan Kititharakul / Rawinda Prajongjai (semi-finals)
 Gabriela Stoeva / Stefani Stoeva (final)
 Chow Mei Kuan / Lee Meng Yean (quarter-finals)
 Maiken Fruergaard / Sara Thygesen (withdrew)
 Chloe Birch / Lauren Smith (semi-finals)
 Selena Piek / Cheryl Seinen (quarter-finals)
 Hsu Ya-ching / Hu Ling-fang (quarter-finals)

Finals

Top half

Section 1

Section 2

Bottom half

Section 3

Section 4

Mixed doubles

Seeds

 Goh Soon Huat / Shevon Jemie Lai (quarter-finals)
 Tan Kian Meng / Lai Pei Jing (second round)
 Chris Adcock / Gabby Adcock (first round)
 Marcus Ellis / Lauren Smith (quarter-finals)
 Robin Tabeling / Selena Piek (first round)
 Thom Gicquel / Delphine Delrue (final)
 Mark Lamsfuß / Isabel Herttrich (second round)
 Wang Chi-lin / Cheng Chi-ya (first round)

Finals

Top half

Section 1

Section 2

Bottom half

Section 3

Section 4

References

External links
 Tournament Link

Spain Masters
Spain Masters
Spain Masters
Sports competitions in Barcelona
Spain Masters